Jules Barthoux or Jules Couyat-Barthoux (1881-1965) was a French geologist and archaeologist born in Etroussat in 1881. He excavated the sites of Bagram, Hadda and Ai-Khanoum in Afghanistan, as part of the French Archaeological Delegation in Afghanistan (DAFA), between 1925 and 1928. He died in 1965 in the 20th arrondissement of Paris, in Paris, France.

Works

 The hieroglyphic and hieratic inscriptions of Ouâdi Hammâmât with P. Montet, Cairo (1912)
 Chronology and description of igneous rocks of the Arabian desert , Cairo (1922)
 Description of a fortress of Saladin discovered in Sinai: the inscriptions of the Qal'ah Guindi with G. Wiet, Paris (1922)
 Notes of Moroccan metallogeny , Tours (1923)
 Description of some Moroccan minerals , Paris (1924)
 The excavations of Haḍḍa I, Stupas and sites. Text and drawings , Paris (1933)
 The excavations of Haḍḍa , Paris (1933)
 The excavations of Hadda III, figures and figurines , Tours (1930)
 Provisional Geological Map of Djebilet , sl

References
 Zemaryallaï Tarzi, (Jules Barthoux: The forgotten discoverer of Ai-Khanoum), Comptes-rendus des séances de l'Académie des Inscriptions et Belles-Lettres, year 1996, Volume 140, issue 2, pp. 595–611 (external link)

People from Allier
1881 births
1965 deaths
French archaeologists
Historians of Afghanistan
20th-century archaeologists